Granitz may refer to:

 The Granitz a region and nature reserve on Germany's largest island, Rügen, in the state of Mecklenburg-Western Pomerania, which has given its name to:
 Granitz Hunting Lodge, a former hunting lodge and now a tourist attraction on Rügen
 Granitz House, a former forester's lodge and inn which is today the information centre for the Southeast Rügen Biosphere Reserve
 Mönchgut-Granitz, a subdistrict or Amt on Rügen
 Lancken-Granitz, a municipality in the above subdistrict
 Granitzer Ort, a headland on the east coast of Rügen

  Granitz, a common geographic and family name in Austria and Bavaria. It is derived from the Old Slavic word Granica = border.
 Granitz (Eichendorf), village in the market borough of Eichendorf, Dingolfing-Landau district, Bavaria
 Granitz (Reisbach), village in the market borough of Reisbach, Dingolfing-Landau district, Bavaria
 Granitz (Bach) in Carinthia, Austria
 Granitz (hill), wooded heights höhe south of the Lavanttal valley
 Granitzen, a former independent municipality on the border of Styria and Carinthia in Austria
 Granitzenbach, a roughly 40 km long waterbody in the west of Styria, Austria
 Surname
 Ignjat Granitz (1845–1908), known Croatian industrialist, philanthropist and publisher

See also
 Granica (disambiguation)